The Skarsbo Apartments is a group of buildings located at 204 and 210 North Sixth Street, Grand Forks, North Dakota which were added to the National Register of Historic Places on 27 August 2013.
The complex consists of two nearly identical brick apartment buildings and an associated caretakers cottage. The buildings are considered to be excellent examples of apartment buildings built in Grand Forks in the late 1920s.

References

Residential buildings on the National Register of Historic Places in North Dakota
Residential buildings completed in 1928
National Register of Historic Places in Grand Forks, North Dakota
1928 establishments in North Dakota